was a Japanese idol girl group that formed in 2017 through a music competition show of the same name and disbanded in 2022 due to the impact of the COVID-19 pandemic.

History
In July 2017, Yasushi Akimoto started planning and recruiting participants for an audition program in order to form a new idol group. The show began airing on TV Asahi from August 13. On December 20, Last Idol's debut single, "Bandwagon", was released.

On February 14, 2018, Last Idol held their first concert. They released their second single, "Kimi no Achoo!", on April 18. Yako Koga, Aya Yoshizaki, and Orin graduated from the group on June 30. Their third single, "Suki de Suki de Shōganai", was released on August 1. Their fourth single, "Everything Will Be All Right", was released on October 24. They released their fifth single, "Ai Shika Buki ga Nai", on December 5.

On April 17, 2019, the group released their sixth single, "Otona Survivor". Natsumi Ishikawa, Asami Enmei, Minori Odanaka, and Honoka Nagai graduated from the group on July 28. Mayu Takahashi graduated from the group on August 6. Their seventh single, "Seishun Train", was released on September 11. Moe Shinoda graduated from the group on September 29. Juria Honjo graduated from the group on December 8. Rio Kiyohara graduated from the group on December 26.

Yuna Tanaka and Natsumi Oishi graduated from the group on March 31, 2020. On April 5, the group released their eighth single, "Ai o Shiru". Himari Kato and Mahiro Yamada graduated from the group on April 5. Reia Inoko graduated from the group on June 30. Their ninth single, "Nanbito mo", was released on November 4. Kana Asahi and Shuri Nakamura graduated from the group on December 31.

Misaki Kimura graduated from the group on February 28, 2021. On April 28, the group released their tenth single, "Kimi wa Nan Carat?". Midori Nagatsuki and Hinako Iwama graduated from the group on July 31. Moe Suto graduated from the group on August 4. Their eleventh single, "Break a Leg!" on December 8. Mana Mizuno graduated from the group on December 31.

Honoka Machida graduated from the group on January 31, 2022. On March 9, it was announced that Last Idol would disband on May 31 due to the effects of the COVID-19 pandemic. On April 27, the group released the first and final studio album, Last Album.

Former members

Sub-units
LaLuce: Airi Yasuda, Aya Yoshizaki, Haruka Suzuki, Midori Nagatsuki, Nanami Abe, Natsumi Oishi, Yako Koga
Good Tears: Airi Ikematsu, Kana Asahi, Mayu Takahashi, Orin, Ruka Aizawa
: Aimi Ozawa, Midori Nagatsuki, Momona Matsumoto
Someday Somewhere: Himeri Momiyama, Mahiro Yamada, Misaki Kimura, Reia Inoko, Rio Kiyohara, Wakana Majima
Love Cocchi: Airi Yamamoto, Honoka Nishimura, Natsumi Ishikawa, Rio Ohmori, Shuri Nakamura

Discography

Studio albums

Singles

References

Japanese girl groups
Japanese idol groups
Japanese pop music groups
Musical groups from Tokyo
Musical groups established in 2017
2017 establishments in Japan
Musical groups disestablished in 2022
2022 disestablishments in Japan